Princess Annette of Orange-Nassau, van Vollenhoven-Sekrève (legal name: Annette van Vollenhoven-Sekrève; born 18 April 1972) is the wife of Prince Bernhard of Orange-Nassau, van Vollenhoven, the second son of Princess Margriet of the Netherlands and Pieter van Vollenhoven.

Annette Sekrève was born in The Hague, the daughter of Ulrich Sekrève and his wife Jolanda de Haan (the De Haan belong to the Dutch patriciate). She obtained her vwo diploma in 1991 and studied from 1991 till 1996 at Groningen University where she obtained an MSc degree in psychology. It was at university that she met her future husband, Prince Bernhard.

The couple announced their engagement on 11 March 2000. They married in July 2000. The civil ceremony was performed on 6 July 2000 by the Mayor of Utrecht, Ms A. H. Brouwer-Korf, in the Spiegelzaal van het Paushuize, Utrecht. The marriage was blessed two days later, on 8 July 2000, by Dr. Anne van der Meiden in the Cathedral of Saint Martin, Utrecht. Annette then acquired the courtesy title Her Highness, Princess of Orange-Nassau, van Vollenhoven due to her status as the wife of a Prince of Orange-Nassau.

Since 2002, Princess Annette has worked as a counsellor at the AGO foundation in Amsterdam.

Princess Annette and Prince Bernhard have three children:
 Isabella Lily Juliana van Vollenhoven, born in Amsterdam, on 14 May 2002
 Samuel Bernhard Louis van Vollenhoven, born in Amsterdam, on 25 May 2004
 Benjamin Pieter Floris van Vollenhoven, born in Amsterdam, on 12 March 2008

The family resides in Amsterdam and lead low-profile lives, with attendance only at major royal family events including King's Day.

External links
Dutch Royal House webpage

1972 births
Living people
House of Orange-Nassau
Princesses of Orange-Nassau
Protestant Church Christians from the Netherlands
Vollenhoven-Sekreve, Annette
University of Groningen alumni